Rex Riot, born Nicholas Rex Valente, is an American electronic music record producer. He is known for his work with Nintendo, for their 2012 Wii U Campaign, and various work including a popular remix of Kanye West's "All of the Lights", which he produced with Infuze. He currently has releases under Play Me Records and Heavy Artillery Records.

Rex Riot's career as a mainstream electronic musician began with DJ Neekola's debut commercial house album Playtime in 2010, on which he was a co-producer and had a remix of the title track. Playtime quickly gained local, and later international success, and was eventually signed to Nom Nom Records.

Riot is easily recognized by his use of an astronaut theme evidenced by a NASA spacesuit which he wears while DJing. He can also be seen wearing a gas mask and his work is often driven by sexual themes.

He currently lives in Washington, D.C.

References

External links
 Official site

Year of birth missing (living people)
Living people
American record producers
American electronic musicians